Line Henriette Holten Hjemdal (born 18 October 1971 in Sarpsborg) is a Norwegian politician for the Christian Democratic Party and former 5th Vice President of the Storting.

Holten Hjemdal was the vice leader of the Youth of the Christian People's Party in 1991–1993, and general secretary of the organization in 1997–2000. During the second cabinet Bondevik, Holten Hjemdal worked as a political advisor in the Ministry of Health and Care Services (2001–2004) and the Ministry of Labour and Social Affairs (2004–2005)

Holten Hjemdal was a member of Askim city council during the term 2003–2007, and a deputy member of Østfold county council in 1991–1995.

She was elected to the Norwegian Parliament from Østfold in 2005. Her father Odd Holten had held the seat from 1989 to 2005.

References

1971 births
Living people
Christian Democratic Party (Norway) politicians
Norwegian Christians
Members of the Storting
Women members of the Storting
21st-century Norwegian politicians
21st-century Norwegian women politicians